2019 Metfone C-League  is the 35th season of the C-League. Contested by 14 clubs, it operates on a system of promotion and relegation with Cambodian Second League.

2019 season clubs

Teams

Notes;
Kirivong Sok Sen Chey and two other teams will be invited to the 2019 season because the Cambodian Second League will not be held in 2019. FFC will announce its decision before regular season starts.

Personnel and Kits

Foreign players

The number of foreign players is restricted to five per team. A team can use four foreign players on the field in each game, including at least one player from the AFC country.

Players name in bold indicates the player is registered during the mid-season transfer window.

Notes;
Both Bati Academy and Electricite du Cambodge do not use foreign players.

League table

Positions by round

Results by match played

Results

Matches

Fixtures and results of the 2019 C-League season.

Week 1

Week 2

Week 3

Week 4

Week 5

Week 6

Week 7

Week 8

Week 9

Week 10

Week 11

Week 12

Week 13

Week 14

Week 15

Week 16

Week 17

Week 18

Week 19

Top scorers

Clean sheets

Awards

See also
2019 Hun Sen Cup

References

Cambodia
C-League seasons
1